Samir Louadj (born 9 December 1985 in Forbach) is a French professional footballer who plays as a midfielder for Luxembourg club CS Grevenmacher.

Club career
Louadj began his career in the junior ranks of his hometown team US Forbach. After playing briefly for FC Nantes and FC Metz, Louadj joined SV Eintracht Trier 05 in 2003. Louadj stayed at Eintracht Trier until 2006, making 16 appearances and scoring 1 goal in the Regionalliga Süd. In 2006, he returned to join US Forbach for one season, scoring 16 goals in 20 games. In 2007, Louadj signed with F91 Dudelange in the Luxembourg National Division. He remained at the club until the end of 2008.

International career
Louadj was called up to an Algerian under-20 training camp but never featured for the team.

Honours 
F91 Dudelange
Luxembourg National Division: 2007–08, 2008–09, 2013–14
Luxembourg Cup (1): 2009

References

External links
 Samir Louadj at fussballportal.de 

1985 births
Living people
French sportspeople of Algerian descent
Algerian footballers
French footballers
SV Eintracht Trier 05 players
F91 Dudelange players
CS Grevenmacher players
2. Bundesliga players
Expatriate footballers in Germany
Expatriate footballers in Luxembourg
French expatriate footballers 
Algerian expatriate footballers
Algerian expatriate sportspeople in Germany
Algerian expatriate sportspeople in Luxembourg
French expatriate sportspeople in Germany
French expatriate sportspeople in Luxembourg
Algeria youth international footballers
Association football midfielders
People from Forbach
Sportspeople from Moselle (department)
Footballers from Grand Est